Santeri Heiskanen (born April 13, 1977) is a Finnish former professional ice hockey defenceman.

References

External links

Living people
Espoo Blues players
1977 births
Finnish ice hockey defencemen
Ice hockey people from Helsinki
20th-century Finnish people
21st-century Finnish people